Travis Michael Kelce (born October 5, 1989) is an American football tight end for the Kansas City Chiefs of the National Football League (NFL). He was drafted by the Chiefs in the third round of the 2013 NFL Draft and later won Super Bowls LIV and LVII with the team. He played college football at Cincinnati. 

Considered to be one of the greatest tight ends of all time, Kelce is an eight-time Pro Bowler and a four-time first-team All-Pro selection. He holds the NFL record for most consecutive and most overall seasons with 1,000 yards receiving by a tight end with 7. He also owns the record for most receiving yards by a tight end in a single season with 1,416 in 2020, despite playing in only 15 games. He also briefly held the single season record in 2018 before it was broken later that same day. During the 2022 season, Kelce became the fastest tight end to reach 10,000 career receiving yards, and he became the fifth tight end in NFL history to reach the milestone. Kelce was named to the NFL 2010s All-Decade Team.

Early life
Kelce was born on October 5, 1989, in Westlake, Ohio, the son of Ed and Donna Kelce and younger brother to fellow NFL player Jason Kelce, who is a center for the Philadelphia Eagles. He attended Cleveland Heights High School in his hometown of Cleveland Heights, Ohio, where he was a three-sport athlete in football, basketball and baseball. Excelling at football, he was a three-year letter winner as quarterback for the Tigers, and recognized with All-Lake Erie League honors after totaling 2,539 yards of total offense as a senior. He ran 1,016 rushing yards and 10 rushing touchdowns, threw for 1,523 passing yards, 21 touchdowns, and eight interceptions in 2007.

College career
Considered a two-star recruit by Rivals.com, Kelce accepted a scholarship offer from the University of Cincinnati over offers from Akron, Eastern Michigan, and Miami (OH). He joined his brother, Jason Kelce, who was the starting left guard for the Bearcats. After redshirting in 2008, he appeared in 11 games, playing at tight end and quarterback out of the Wildcat formation. He tallied eight rushes for 47 yards and two touchdowns along with one reception for three yards in 2009. The following season, he did not play due to a violation of team rules, which was later revealed to be failing a drug test by testing positive for marijuana. After serving a one-year suspension, Kelce was back with the team to start the 2011 season. For the season, he saw action in games as a tight end and recorded 13 catches totaling 150 yards and two touchdowns. In his last collegiate season, he set personal career highs in receptions (45), receiving yards (722), yards per receptions (16.0), and receiving touchdowns (8), he also earned first-team all-conference honors. In March 2013, Kelce was named winner of the College Football Performance Awards Tight End of the Year.

Collegiate statistics

Professional career

2013 NFL Draft

Kelce was drafted by the Kansas City Chiefs in the third round (63rd pick overall) of the 2013 NFL Draft. The Chiefs had hired Andy Reid as their new head coach during the off-season. Reid was familiar with Kelce after he had drafted and coached his brother, Jason Kelce, during his time as the head coach of the Philadelphia Eagles. On June 6, 2013, the Chiefs signed him to a four-year, $3.12 million rookie contract that also included a signing bonus of $703,304.

Kansas City Chiefs

2013 season

On October 12, Kelce was placed on injured reserve after having surgery on his knee. He only played one snap on special teams in the team’s Week 2 game against the Dallas Cowboys.

2014 season

During Week 3 against the Miami Dolphins, Kelce recorded his first NFL touchdown on a 20-yard reception from quarterback Alex Smith. On November 30, he was fined $11,025 for "unsportsmanlike conduct" during a 29–16 loss to the Denver Broncos. Kelce made an inappropriate hand gesture and motion at the Broncos linebacker Von Miller. Chiefs head coach Andy Reid later called this "immature". In the next game against the Arizona Cardinals, Kelce had seven receptions for 110 yards for his first NFL game with over 100 receiving yards. In the regular-season finale against the San Diego Chargers, he had an offensive fumble recovery for a touchdown in the 19–7 victory. Kelce was the Chiefs leading receiver during the 2014 season, totaling 862 yards off 67 receptions.

2015 season

Kelce began the 2015 season with his first NFL multiple touchdown game, with six receptions for 106 yards and two touchdowns in the 27–20 victory over the Houston Texans. It was his only 100+ yard game, but he had at least one reception in all 16 games, and was ranked a top-five tight end by ESPN. He started all 16 regular season games and recorded 72 catches for 875 yards and five touchdowns, earning his way to his first Pro Bowl. The Chiefs finished the regular season with an 11–5 record and made the playoffs. In his first NFL playoff game, Kelce had eight receptions for 128 yards in a 30–0 Wild Card Round victory over the Texans. In the Divisional Round against the New England Patriots, Kelce had six receptions for 23 yards as the Chiefs lost 27–20.  He was ranked 91st by his peers on the NFL Top 100 Players of 2016.

2016 season

On January 29, 2016, Kelce signed a five-year, $46 million contract extension. He was ranked 91st by his fellow players on the NFL Top 100 Players of 2016.

During Week 8 against the Indianapolis Colts, Kelce had seven receptions for 101 yards and a touchdown. In the next game against the Jacksonville Jaguars, he was ejected after receiving two unsportsmanlike conduct penalties after arguing with two referees over not having a pass interference penalty called. The second resulted from him sarcastically throwing his towel at field judge Mike Weatherford in a flagging motion due to being upset about the first penalty. He was later fined $24,309 for his outburst. During Week 13 against the Atlanta Falcons, he had eight receptions for 140 yards. In the next game, Kelce recorded 101 receiving yards against the Oakland Raiders, his fourth consecutive game topping 100. He joined Jimmy Graham and former Chiefs tight end Tony Gonzalez as the only NFL tight ends ever to do so. In a Christmas Day win over the Denver Broncos, Kelce had career bests of 11 receptions for 160 yards and a career long 80-yard touchdown on a screen pass. He finished the season with career highs in yards (1,125) and receptions (85). His 1,125 receiving yards led the league among tight ends and his 85 receptions were second among tight ends behind Dennis Pitta of the Baltimore Ravens. Kelce's 634 yards after the catch also led all NFL tight ends. He was named as a starter in his second career Pro Bowl, held on December 20, 2016. He was also named First-team All-Pro. He was ranked 26th by his fellow players, and second among tight ends, on the NFL Top 100 Players of 2017.

The Chiefs finished atop the AFC West with a 12–4 record and earned a first-round bye in the playoffs. In the Divisional Round against the Pittsburgh Steelers, Kelce had five receptions for 77 yards in the 18–16 loss.

2017 season
 

During Week 2 against the Philadelphia Eagles, Kelce had eight receptions for 103 yards and a touchdown in the 27–20 victory. After just one reception for one yard in Week 3 against the Los Angeles Chargers, Kelce recorded seven receptions for 111 yards and a touchdown in Week 4 against the Washington Redskins followed by eight for 98 in Week 5 against the Houston Texans. During Week 8, Kelce had seven receptions for 133 yards to pass Zach Ertz as the NFL's leading tight end in both categories, along with a touchdown. During Week 13 against the New York Jets, Kelce opened the game with spectacular fashion, scoring two receiving touchdowns on 90 receiving yards in the first 2 minutes and 46 seconds of regulation. He finished the game with 94 receiving yards on four receptions in the 38–31 loss. On December 19, 2017, Kelce was named to his third straight Pro Bowl. Kelce finished the season with a career-high eight receiving touchdowns. He finished second among tight ends with 1,038 receiving yards, only trailing Gronkowski's 1,084 receiving yards. He was ranked 24th by his peers on the NFL Top 100 Players of 2018.

The 10–6 Chiefs entered the Wild Card Round of the playoffs against the Tennessee Titans, where Kelce finished with four receptions for 66 yards and a touchdown in the 21–22 defeat. He was not able to finish the game as he suffered a concussion in the first half on a hit to his helmet.

2018 season

In the 2018 season, Kelce benefited from the rise of new quarterback Patrick Mahomes, who had an MVP season. After being held to a lone reception for six yards in the season opener against the Los Angeles Chargers, he rebounded with seven receptions for 106 yards and two touchdowns in a Week 2 road victory over the Pittsburgh Steelers. In two of the next three games, he was able to reach 100 receiving yards against the San Francisco 49ers and the Jacksonville Jaguars. He added 99 yards and two touchdowns in a Week 9 win over the Cleveland Browns, and went into the Week 12 bye with 10 receptions for 127 yards and a touchdown in an offensively-spectacular 54–51 loss to the Los Angeles Rams. In the Week 13 win over the Oakland Raiders, Kelce had career-bests of 12 receptions and 168 yards, including two short touchdowns in the first half. At this point, he was well on his way to an NFL record, but his production tapered off; over the final four weeks, Kelce averaged six receptions for 63.5 yards and had only one touchdown reception. In Week 17, Kelce indeed broke the NFL record for most receiving yards by a tight end in a single season, but 49ers tight end George Kittle passed him to claim the record less than an hour later. Kelce ended the regular season at 10th in the NFL in receptions with 103 and receiving yards with 1,336, and sixth in receiving touchdowns with 10. He was named to the 2018 Pro Bowl and was named first-team All-Pro.

The Chiefs finished atop the AFC West with a 12–4 record and earned a first-round bye. In the Divisional Round against the Indianapolis Colts, he had seven receptions for 108 yards in the 31–13 victory. In the AFC Championship against the New England Patriots, he had three receptions for 23 yards and a receiving touchdown in the 37–31 overtime loss. He was ranked 21st by his fellow players on the NFL Top 100 Players of 2018.

2019 season: Super Bowl champions
During Week 2 against the Oakland Raiders, Kelce caught seven passes for 107 yards and a touchdown of the season as the Chiefs won by a score of 28–10. Despite injuries to quarterback Patrick Mahomes and just two touchdowns, at the midpoint of the season Kelce led all tight ends and Chiefs players in receiving yards with 604. During Week 11 against the Los Angeles Chargers on Monday Night Football in Mexico, Kelce caught seven passes for 92 yards and a touchdown in the 24–17 win. During Week 14 against the New England Patriots, Kelce caught seven passes for 66 yards and rushed the ball once for a one-yard touchdown during the 23–16 road victory. In the next game against the Denver Broncos, Kelce finished with 11 catches for 142 receiving yards as the Chiefs won 23–3. In the next game against the Chicago Bears on Sunday Night Football, he caught eight passes for 74 yards and a touchdown in the 26–3 win. During the game, he became the fastest tight end in NFL history to record 500 career receptions.

Kelce finished the 2019 season with 97 receptions for 1,229 receiving yards and five receiving touchdowns to go along with his one rushing touchdown. Kelce became the first tight end in NFL history to record four consecutive seasons with at least 1,000 receiving yards. He was named to his fifth Pro Bowl for his 2019 season.

In the Divisional Round against the Houston Texans, the Chiefs began the game with a 24–0 deficit. The Chiefs would then go on a 51–7 run, including 41 unanswered points, to win 51–31. After a drop on third down on the Chiefs first drive that would have been a first down if it had been caught, Kelce caught 10 passes for 134 yards and three touchdowns (all in the second quarter) as he helped lead the Chiefs to their second consecutive conference championship game. In the AFC Championship Game against the Tennessee Titans, Kelce caught three passes for 30 yards during the 35–24 win. In Super Bowl LIV against the San Francisco 49ers, Kelce caught six passes for 43 receiving yards and a receiving touchdown and had one carry for two rushing yards during the 31–20 win. He was ranked 18th by his fellow players on the NFL Top 100 Players of 2020.

2020 season: Second Super Bowl appearance
Following the release of long-time Chiefs punter Dustin Colquitt in the offseason, Kelce became tied with Anthony Sherman and fellow 2013 draftee Eric Fisher as the longest tenured members of the Chiefs. On August 14, 2020, Kelce signed a four-year, $57 million contract extension with the Chiefs through the 2025 season. In Week 6, against the Buffalo Bills, he recorded two receiving touchdowns in the 26–17 victory. In Week 8 against the New York Jets, Kelce dunked the ball through the goal posts after scoring a touchdown, paying homage to former Chiefs tight end Tony Gonzalez. He was penalized for unsportsmanlike conduct and was fined $12,500. In Week 9, against the Carolina Panthers, he had ten receptions for 159 receiving yards in the 33–31 victory.  
In Week 11 against the Las Vegas Raiders on Sunday Night Football, Kelce recorded eight catches for 127 yards including the game-winning touchdown during the 35–31 win.
In Week 13 against the Denver Broncos on Sunday Night Football, Kelce recorded eight catches for 136 yards and a touchdown during the 22–16 win. In the following game, he posted an identical statistical performance of eight catches for 136 yards and a touchdown against the Miami Dolphins in a 33–27 victory. In Week 16, Kelce became the first tight end to have two 100-catch seasons. Kelce caught seven passes, giving him a career-high 105 for the season. Kelce set the single-season yardage record for a tight end with 1,416, topping the 1,377 yards posted by George Kittle in 2018. His yardage ranked second overall in the 2020 NFL season (behind Stefon Diggs' 1,535), while his total receptions ranked fifth in the NFL and second among tight ends (behind Darren Waller's 107). He was named to his sixth Pro Bowl and earned First-team All-Pro honors.

In the Divisional Round of the playoffs against the Cleveland Browns, Kelce recorded eight catches for 109 yards and a touchdown during the 22–17 win. In the AFC Championship against the Bills, Kelce recorded 13 catches for 118 yards and two touchdowns in a 38–24 win to advance to Super Bowl LV. In the Super Bowl, despite Kelce catching 10 passes for 133 yards which set the record for most receiving yards by a tight end in a single Super Bowl, the Chiefs could not score a touchdown in the 31–9 loss to the Tampa Bay Buccaneers. He was ranked fifth by his fellow players on the NFL Top 100 Players of 2021.

2021 season

Following the release of longtime Chiefs left tackle Eric Fisher and retirement of longtime fullback Anthony Sherman in the offseason, Kelce became the longest-tenured member of the Chiefs. In the Chiefs second game of the season against the Baltimore Ravens, he become the fastest tight end in NFL history to record 8,000 career yards, surpassing Rob Gronkowski's record in 113 games. In the Chiefs week 15 game against the Los Angeles Chargers, he set a career high for receiving yards in a game with 191 yards. He also caught two touchdowns, including the game-winning 34-yard touchdown in overtime. He was named AFC Offensive Player of the Week for his performance. The game also put him over 1,000 yards for the season, his NFL record (among tight ends) extending sixth consecutive 1,000 yard season. It also extended his record for most 1,000 yard seasons by a tight end with six. He was placed on the Reserve/COVID-19 list on December 20, 2021. He was activated on December 25, 2021. However, due to NFL protocols for COVID-19, since he tested positive for the virus and did not test negative before the day of the game, he was ruled out for the Chiefs Week 16 game against the Pittsburgh Steelers. It was the first game he's missed due to injury or illness since his rookie season. In the regular season-ending game against the Denver Broncos, Kelce became the fastest tight end in NFL history to reach 9,000 career yards in just 127 games, a record also previously held by Gronkowski with 140 games. He finished the season with 92 receptions for 1,125 receiving yards and nine touchdowns. He was named Second-Team All-Pro by the AP, his sixth overall All-Pro selection. He was also named to his seventh consecutive Pro Bowl.

In the Wild Card Round against the Pittsburgh Steelers, Kelce had five receptions for 108 yards and a receiving touchdown to go along with a two-yard touchdown pass to Byron Pringle in the 42–21 victory. In the Divisional Round against the Buffalo Bills, he had eight receptions for 96 yards and the game-winning touchdown in the 42–36 overtime victory. In the AFC Championship against the Cincinnati Bengals, he had 10 receptions for 95 yards and a touchdown in the 27–24 overtime loss.

2022 season: Super Bowl champions
In Week 5, Kelce had four receiving touchdowns in the 30–29 victory over the Las Vegas Raiders. Kelce tied the franchise record for receiving touchdowns in a game. In the Chiefs Week 11 game against the Los Angeles Chargers, he recorded his NFL record breaking (among tight ends) 33rd 100-yard receiving game with 115 yards. He also scored three touchdowns, including the game winning touchdown, his second straight season recording a game winning touchdown against the Chargers. In Week 14 against the Denver Broncos, he became the fifth tight end in NFL history to have 10,000 receiving yards. He also officially recorded his seventh consecutive 1,000 yard season, extending his records (among tight ends) of consecutive 1,000 yard seasons and most overall 1,000 seasons. He finished the 2022 season with 110 receptions for 1,338 receiving yards and 12 receiving touchdowns.

Kelce set a single-game NFL postseason record for a tight end with 14 receptions in a 27–20 victory over the Jacksonville Jaguars in the Divisional Round. He scored two receiving touchdowns in the game. Kelce and the Chiefs appeared in Super Bowl LVII against the Philadelphia Eagles. Travis's brother Jason Kelce played for the Eagles, making it the first Super Bowl to feature two brothers on opposing teams. Kelce caught six passes for 81 yards and a touchdown as the Chiefs beat the Eagles 38–35 in the Super Bowl to give Travis his second Super Bowl ring.

NFL career statistics

Regular season

Post season

NFL records

NFL (among tight ends)
 Consecutive 1,000+ yard seasons (7, 2016–2022)
 1,000 yard seasons (7, 2016–2022)
 Most receiving yards in a season (1,416, 2020)
 Most career postseason receptions by a tight end (133)
 100+ reception seasons (3)
 Fewest games to 10,000 career receiving yards (140)
 Most 100 receiving yard games (35)
 Most career postseason receiving touchdowns by a tight end: 16

Chiefs franchise records (any position)
 100+ yard receiving games (35)
 Receiving touchdowns in a game (tied, 4)

Awards and honors

NFL
 2× Super Bowl champion (LIV, LVII)
 4× First-team All-Pro (2016,   2018,   2020, 2022)
 3× Second-team All-Pro (2017, 2019, 2021)
 8× Pro Bowl (2015–2022)
 NFL 2010s All-Decade Team

College
 First-team All-Big East (2012)

Personal life
Kelce is the younger brother of Jason Kelce, a center for the Philadelphia Eagles.

In 2015, Kelce started the Eighty-Seven & Running foundation to give mentoring, training, motivation, and opportunities to underprivileged youth.

In May 2017, Kelce was confirmed to be in a relationship with social media influencer Kayla Nicole. Travis and Kayla later broke up in May 2022.

"Fight for Your Right"
Through his Super Bowl runs with the Chiefs, Kelce became known for reciting the chorus from the Beastie Boys' 1986 song "(You Gotta) Fight for Your Right (To Party!)" during team celebrations, first after the 2019 AFC Championship Game then again at the parade in Kansas City after clinching Super Bowl LIV. The Chiefs responded by making "Fight for Your Right" its touchdown song during games at Arrowhead Stadium. Kelce would continue the practice with the Chiefs' second championship in four years, adding a live performance of the song with Jimmy Fallon on The Tonight Show.

Television appearances
In January 2016, Kelce starred in the E! Entertainment Television dating show Catching Kelce. The winner picked by Kelce was Maya Benberry, and they started dating after the show ended in April 2016. In January 2017, Benberry confirmed that they had broken up. 

Kelce was the host of Saturday Night Live on March 4, 2023. His brother Jason also made an appearance on that episode with their parents as audience members, and he also was in a sketch with Travis and SNL cast members Heidi Gardner and Chloe Fineman.

Last name pronunciation
During the 2021 offseason, Kelce said he pronounces his last name  , because that is the way his father pronounces it, although the rest of the paternal side of his family pronounces it  . Kelce's brother, Jason, later elaborated that their father "at some point ... got tired of correcting everyone calling him 'Kell-see.' ... And now I think we're both at the point where we're riding with Ed 'Kell-see.

References

External links
 
 Cincinnati Bearcats profile
 Kansas City Chiefs profile
 Eighty-Seven & Running

1989 births
Living people
10,000 receiving yards club
American Conference Pro Bowl players
American football tight ends
Cincinnati Bearcats football players
Cleveland Heights High School alumni
Ed Block Courage Award recipients
Kansas City Chiefs players
People from Cleveland Heights, Ohio
People from Westlake, Ohio
Players of American football from Ohio
Sportspeople from Cuyahoga County, Ohio
Unconferenced Pro Bowl players